The men's singles event at the 2013 Mediterranean Games was held from 24 to 29 June at the Mersin Tennis Complex.

Blaž Rola of Slovenia won the gold medal, defeating Marsel İlhan of Turkey in the final, 6–7(6–8), 6–2, 3–6, 7–6(7–4), 6–2.

Malek Jaziri of Tunisia won the bronze medal, defeating his fellow countryman Mohamed Haythem Abid in the bronze medal match, 7–5, 6–3.

Medalists

Seeds

Draw

References

Tennis at the 2013 Mediterranean Games